Bergen is a village in Genesee County, New York, United States. The population was 1,176 at the 2010 census.

The village lies on the eastern edge of the town of Bergen. The village is north of the junction of Routes 19 and 33.

History
See also Bergen (town), New York.

The Bergen area was opened up in 1801 when a road was hacked through the thick "Northwoods" from LeRoy to Lake Ontario. (In its early days of settlement, Bergen was called "Northwoods".) Bergen was first settled in 1801 by Samuel Lincoln. In the same year George Letson, William Letson, Benajah Worden, Richard Abbey, Solomon Levi, Jesse Leach, James Letson, Gideon Elliott, and David Scott settled in town.

A colony of 60 families from Connecticut settled the area along Route 19 from Fort Hill (near Parmalee Road) to Black Creek from 1805 to 1810. The first store was a mile south of Route 33 on Route 19 on the east side of the road. The first group of stores was located from the intersection of Lake Road (Route 19) and Route 262 to the intersection of Route 19 and the Scottsville Road (Route 33A). This area was called "Buell's Corner", later "Bergen Corners" or "High Bergen". The first church organization was established in December 1807. The Congregational church was founded January 25, 1808. Harry Kelsey, a graduate of Yale College, taught the first school. The first frame house in the town was erected by Levi Ward, a pioneer physician. Jared Merritt built the first sawmill. Dr. Ward was proprietor of the first store, in 1808. The first inn was opened in 1809 by Samuel Butler. Colonel W.H. Ward was the first postmaster.

After the railroad came through in 1836, an area was laid out around the intersection of Lake Road (Route 19) and the railroad for businesses and houses. It was called "Wardville" after the Levi Ward family who laid it out. It was also called "Cork", after the Irish who settled there while and after the building of the railroad, and "Lower Bergen". The two areas were soon connected by residences and churches.

Fire initially destroyed the business area around the railroad tracks in 1866.

This area, along with the surrounding residences, was incorporated in on March 5, 1877, as the Village of Bergen. The village is near the center of the eastern boundary line, on the New York Central and Hudson River Railroad.

Fire destroyed the business area around the railroad tracks again in 1880. The Village Board passed an ordinance requiring that all structures in this area should be built of brick, stone, or wrought iron.

The west side of the district south of the railroad is on the National Register as the Lake Street Historic District due to its 1880 wrought-iron storefronts, transom windows and probably, also, because of the famous family who founded "Wardville". Some of the family went on from Bergen to the Rochester area and were primary developers of that area.

Due to better building material and firefighting equipment, another fire in 1906 destroyed only some of the buildings on the west side of the street. A fire in 1932 leveled some of the buildings on the east side of the street. Since then, fires in individual buildings have caused some alteration of their facades.

Geography
The village of Bergen is located in northeastern Genesee County at  (43.083388, -77.941754), on the eastern side of the town of Bergen. New York State Route 19 passes through the village center as Lake Avenue, leading north  to Brockport and south  to Le Roy. To the southwest NY 33 leads  to Batavia. New York State Route 262 leads west  to Elba. Interstate 490 passes just southeast of Bergen village, with access from exit 2 (NY Route 33A); I-490 leads northeast into Rochester and southwest  to Interstate 90, the New York State Thruway.

The village area drains north to Black Creek, an eastward-flowing tributary of the Genesee River.

Demographics

As of the census of 2000, there were 1,240 people, 466 households, and 317 families residing in the village. The population density was 2,002.3 people per square mile (772.2/km2). There were 477 housing units at an average density of 770.2 per square mile (297.0/km2). The racial makeup of the village was 95.32% White, 0.56% Black or African American, 0.40% Native American, 0.81% Asian, 0.97% from other races, and 1.94% from two or more races. Hispanic or Latino of any race were 1.45% of the population.

There were 466 households, out of which 35.2% had children under the age of 18 living with them, 57.5% were married couples living together, 6.4% had a female householder with no husband present, and 31.8% were non-families. 24.2% of all households were made up of individuals, and 8.2% had someone living alone who was 65 years of age or older. The average household size was 2.66 and the average family size was 3.23.

In the village, the population was spread out, with 28.8% under the age of 18, 7.9% from 18 to 24, 32.8% from 25 to 44, 21.2% from 45 to 64, and 9.3% who were 65 years of age or older. The median age was 35 years. For every 100 females, there were 103.9 males. For every 100 females age 18 and over, there were 102.1 males.

The median income for a household in the village was $51,016, and the median income for a family was $54,327. Males had a median income of $35,909 versus $26,364 for females. The per capita income for the village was $19,689. About 2.2% of families and 3.6% of the population were below the poverty line, including 4.8% of those under age 18 and 7.1% of those age 65 or over.

See also
 Bergen (town), New York

References

External links
 Village of Bergen official website
 Information on the Levi Ward family
 Encyclopedia of Biography  - Dr. Levi Ward Family
 Sameuel Lincoln Reference 1
 Sameuel Lincoln Reference 2
 Sameuel Lincoln Reference 3
 Levi Ward Bergen Reference
 Buell Family of Bergen
 Reference of 1854 Map

Villages in New York (state)
Villages in Genesee County, New York